Panicum verrucosum, common name warty panicgrass, is a plant in North America. It is listed as a special concern and believed extirpated in Connecticut. It is listed as threatened in Indiana and Michigan, and as endangered in Ohio.

References

Flora of North America
verrucosum